Ne znam šta ću majko (I Don't Know What I'll Do Mother) is the fifth release by Bosnian folk singer Zehra Deović. It was released 11 May 1966 through the label PGP-RTB.

Track listing

Personnel
Ansambl Miodraga Todorovića – ensemble

References

1966 EPs
Zehra Deović albums
PGP-RTB EPs